Tibaná is a town and municipality in the Colombian Department of Boyacá, part of the subregion of Márquez Province. It borders Jenesano in the north, Ramiriquí and Chinavita in the east, Chinavita and Úmbita in the south and in the west Turmequé and Nuevo Colón.

Etymology 
Tibaná is named after the Tibanaes, a Chibcha-speaking tribe of the Muisca. Tiba means "chief".

History 
The area around Tibaná was part of the Muisca Confederation and loyal to the zaque of Hunza. Modern Tibaná was founded early in the Spanish conquest; on October 12, 1537 Spanish conquistador Gonzalo Jiménez de Quesada established the village.

Economy 
Main economical activity of Tibaná is horticulture (deciduous trees) and agriculture (potatoes). Mining is restricted to small-scale operations, mainly coal, gravel and clay.

References 

Municipalities of Boyacá Department
Populated places established in 1537
1537 establishments in the Spanish Empire
1537 disestablishments in the Muisca Confederation
Muysccubun